The 2022 U-12 Baseball World Cup was an under 12 international baseball tournament being held from July 28 to August 7 in Tainan, Taiwan. It was the sixth edition of the tournament. The tournament was supposed to be held in 2021 but was delayed due to the COVID-19 pandemic.

Format 
First round: The 11 participating teams were drawn into one group of 6 and one group of 5 for round robin. The top 3 teams from each pool advance to the Super Round while the bottom 3 (or 2) teams play in the Consolation Round.

Consolation Round: The bottom 3 (or 2) teams from each pool play each of the other bottom 3 (or 2) teams from the other pool (ex. The 4th place team from Group A plays the 4th, 5th, and 6th place teams from Pool B). The results of the previous round robin carry over for teams originally in the same pool (ex. The 4th place team from Group A beats both the 5th and 6th place teams from Group A in pool play and starts the consolation round with a 2-0 record.). Teams don't advance to play any more games after the consolation round.

Super Round: The top 3 teams from each pool play each of the other top 3 teams from the other pool (ex. The 1st place team from Group A plays the 1st, 2nd, and 3rd place teams from Group B). The results of the previous round robin carry over for teams originally in the same pool (ex. If the 1st place team from Group A beats both the 2nd and 3rd place teams from Group A in pool play and starts the Super Round with a 2-0 record. The 3rd and 4th-place finishers advance to the Bronze Medal Game, and the 1st and 2nd-place finishers advance to the Gold Medal Game.

Medal Round: The Medal Round consists of the Bronze Medal Game, contested by the 3rd and 4th-place finishers from the Super Round, and the Gold Medal Game, contested by the 1st and 2nd-place finishers.

Teams 
Eleven teams qualified for the tournament. The number in parentheses is their nations ranking in the WBSC World Rankings prior to the start of the tournament.

 
 Chinese Taipei is the official WBSC designation for the team representing the state officially referred to as the Republic of China, more commonly known as Taiwan. (See also political status of Taiwan for details.)

First round

Group A

Group B

Second round

Super Round

Consolation Round

Medal Rounds 
Both the Gold and Bronze medal game were played at ASPAC Youth Stadium in Tainan.

Bronze-medal game

Gold-medal game

See also
 List of sporting events in Taiwan

References

External links
Event Official Website at WBSC

U-12 Baseball World Cup
U-12 Baseball World Cup
U-12 Baseball World Cup
2019
U-12 Baseball World Cup
U-12 Baseball World Cup
Sport in Tainan
U-12 Baseball World Cup